Apterostigma eowilsoni is an extinct species of ant in the subfamily Myrmicinae known from a single possibly Miocene fossil found on Hispaniola. A. eowilsoni is one of only two species of the ant genus Apterostigma  and one of five attini species of to have been described from fossils found in Dominican amber.

History and classification
Apterostigma eowilsoni is known from a solitary fossil insect which is an inclusion in a transparent chunk of Dominican amber. The amber was produced by the extinct Hymenaea protera, which formerly grew on Hispaniola, across northern South America and up to southern Mexico. The specimens were collected from an undetermined amber mine in fossil bearing rocks of the Cordillera Septentrional mountains, northern Dominican Republic. The amber dates from at least the Burdigalian stage of the Miocene, based on studying the associated fossil foraminifera and may be as old as the Middle Eocene, based on the associated fossil coccoliths. This age range is due to the host rock being secondary deposits for the amber, and the Miocene the age range is only the youngest that it might be.

The holotype amber specimen, number DR-16-292, is currently preserved in the amber collections of the US National Museum, and is labeled as part of the Smithsonian Institution ant database as number 00443150. The fossil was first studied by entomologist Ted R. Schultz of the National Museum of Natural History with his 2007 type description of the new species being published in the journal Memoirs of the American Entomological Institute. The specific epithet eowilsoni is a patronym honoring Edward Osborne "E. O." Wilson for his long career and years of important myrmecological discovery.

Prior to the species formal description in 2007, no Apterostigma species were known from the fossil record, however three other Attini species were already known from Dominican Amber, Trachymyrmex primaevus, Cyphomyrmex maya, and Cyphomyrmex taino.  Schultz's paper described a second Dominican amber Apterostigma species, A. electropilosum. Bringing the total Attini fossil record to five species.

Description 
The occiput, rear area of the head capsule, is short, not forming a neck like that seen in A. electropilosum. The integument of the collar is rugose, with longitudinal stria. The antennae are composed of eleven segments, in which the tip segment is 2.25 times the length of the next segment. The eyes are rounded and bulbous in structure with a circumference of twelve ommatidia. The bulbous eyes have a half hemisphere structuring with ommatidia on the sides and front, while the rear sides are integument. The head capsule shows a clypeus which is smooth and shiny, a feature seen in the living pilosum group of Apterostigma species. However the front edge of the clypeus is notably reduced, nearing the absent clypeus border that is a character of the "auriculatum" group. The clypeus structure is most similar to an undescribed pilosum group species collected in Costa Rica, while the eye structure is closest to a "auriculatum" group species A. pariense and A. reburrum. Given the ocular structuring, A. eowilsoni is likely to have had excellent stereoscopic vision but poor side vision and been blind in the rear.

References 

Myrmicinae
Fossil ant taxa
Burdigalian life
Neogene Dominican Republic
Miocene insects of North America
Prehistoric insects of the Caribbean
Fauna of Hispaniola
Insects of the Dominican Republic
Fossils of the Dominican Republic
Dominican amber
Fossil taxa described in 2007